The Tapah Road railway station is a Malaysian railway station stationed at the north eastern side of and named after the town of Tapah Road, Perak. The station is owned by Keretapi Tanah Melayu and provides KTM ETS services. At one end of this station, there is a freight yard. It was made prior to the Rawang-Ipoh Electrified Double Tracking Project.

Location and locality 
The station is located in Kampung Changkat Dermawan, not very close to Tapah Road town in the Batang Padang district, Perak. While Tapah Road sounds synonymous with Tapah, Tapah Road town is actually a small town located ten kilometres west from Tapah town. The town and the station is accessible from the junction from Route A10 Tapah Road which connects Tanjung Keramat at Federal Route 70 (Changkat Jong-Kampar, near Langkap town and accessible to Teluk Intan) to Tapah town at Federal Route 1. Not far from the town, the Tapah campus of Universiti Teknologi MARA (UiTM) is located there, accessible from the same route.

The station mainly not only serve Tapah Road and the main Tapah town, but also surrounding other towns like Langkap and Ayer Kuning as well as places around Tapah town. Due to accessibility and historical reasons, this station also serves passengers that comes as far as Teluk Intan, Kampung Gajah and even Cameron Highlands.

Some notable areas nearby is recreational areas of Kuala Woh, Lata Iskandar and Lata Kinjang as well as educational institutes like Tapah Science School (Sekolah Menengah Sains Tapah), a high-performing boarding school.

History
Built in between 1880 and 1885, the original station is among the oldest of the railway stations in Malaysia. On May 18, 1893, Sir Cecil Clementi Smith officiated the launch of the Tapah Road railway station. This station was originally part of Perak Railway network, which was built altogether from Kinta Valley areas to Telok Anson (now Teluk Intan) back then mainly for transportation of tin mines.

In 1901, Perak Railways merged with Selangor Railways to form what later known as Federated Malay State Railways (FMSR), and the station has been connected with the Selangor networks to form a mainline that goes southeast via Sungkai to Tanjung Malim. The 27 km-long track that goes southwest to Teluk Anson and Telok Anson Wharf is later effectively made a branch line and Tapah Road hence known as a junction station where the train services between these lines meets.

The station later keep serving both lines until Teluk Intan branch line service was discontinued in the 1990s. Even since then, Tapah Road keep being a major station that serves mainline Intercity express and local trains. These services ceased to serve the station as KTMB decided to discontinue many Intercity services in electrified sectors.

In March 2007, as part of the electrified double tracking project between Rawang and Ipoh, it was rebuilt, with the old station building being retained. The station later is made part of ETS pilot service between Ipoh and Kuala Lumpur with Gold and Silver service stops at this station. When the electrified services expanded to the northern states up to Butterworth and Padang Besar, it also has been made a stop for trains heading further north as well, with Platinum services also made a stop there.

External links
 Tapah Road Railway Station

Batang Padang District
KTM ETS railway stations
Railway stations in Perak